"Där du andas" is a pop ballad recorded by Swedish singer-songwriter Marie Fredriksson, known internationally as the lead vocalist of pop music duo Roxette. The song appeared as the theme music to the Swedish epic film Arn – The Kingdom at Road's End, and released as a single by Bonnier Amigo Music Group on 20 August 2008. It appeared on the film's corresponding soundtrack album, Alla himlens änglar – Musik inspirerad av succéfilmen Arn.

The track was written by composer Anders Glenmark and lyricist Niklas Strömstedt, who said its lyrics were inspired by the plot of Arn - Riket vid vägens slut, the second part of a trilogy of novels written by Jan Guillou. Fredriksson had previously worked with both Glenmark and Strömstedt: the former co-wrote and produced Roxette's 1987 non-album single "I Want You", as well as "Alla mina bästa år", her 1996 duet with former ABBA vocalist Anni-Frid Lyngstad, from Frida's album Djupa andetag, while the latter co-wrote two songs on her 1986 album Den sjunde vågen.

Fredriksson said that she "instantly loved the song when Anders and Niklas played it to me for the first time, so it was an easy choice to agree when they asked if I wanted to record it. And, of course, it's incredibly fun to be involved in a big Swedish movie in this way." The track debuted atop the Swedish Singles Chart, becoming her first solo number one single in her native country. She also sang an English language version of the song, titled "Where Your Love Lives", which appeared as a bonus extra on DVD and Blu-ray editions of Arn: The Knight Templar – The Complete Series.

Track listing
 CD single 
 "Där du andas"  – 3:56

Credits and personnel
Credits adapted from the liner notes of the CD single.

Musicians
 André Ferrari – timpani and percussion
 Marie Fredriksson – lead vocals
 Anders Glenmark – composition, arrangement, bass guitar, keyboards and production
 Esbjörn Hazelius – flute and violin
 Niklas Strömstedt – lyricist
 Stockholm Session Strings – string section

Technical personnel
 Henke Jonsson – mastering
 Mårten Eriksson – mixing
 Mattias Edwall – photography

Charts

See also
List of Swedish number-one hits

References

External links

2000s ballads
2008 singles
2008 songs
Celtic music
Marie Fredriksson songs
Number-one singles in Sweden
Pop ballads
Songs written by Anders Glenmark
Songs written by Niklas Strömstedt